Mar Ishodad of Merv (fl. AD 850) was a bishop of Hdatta during the Abbasid Caliphate (near current-day Mosul, Iraq) and prominent theologian of the Church of the East, best known for his Commentaries on the Syriac Bible.

Life 

Very little is known of Ishoʿdad's life, but a few details have survived in annotations to the list of patriarchs compiled by Mari ibn Suleiman and Amr ibn Matta. His epithet "of Merv" may denote a birthplace, meaning that he was born in the city of Merv in Khorasan, but this inference remains conjectural: his relationship to Merv is not known with certainty. A member of the Church of the East—historically, though inaccurately, known as the Nestorian church—he became bishop of Hdatta, a town close to the mouth of the Great Zab in modern Iraq, perhaps in 837 after Abraham II of Seleucia-Ctesiphon left the see to become Patriarch of the Church of the East.

Ishodad was a candidate for the patriarchate of the Church of the East around 853 after Abraham's death. At the time the patriarchate was subject to the Abbasid Caliphate, and after two failed attempts to select a new patriarch, a secretary of the reigning caliph al-Mutawakkil, Ibrahim ibn Nuh al-Anbari, recommended Ishodad for the position. al-Mutawakkil, however, opted for the candidate of Vizier Bukhtishu, Theodosius of Seleucia-Ctesiphon, and Ishoʿdad remained at Hdatta in opposition to the new patriarch. He died shortly afterwards.

Commentaries 

Ishodad is best known for his extensive Syriac exegesis of the Old and New Testaments, the Commentaries. The Commentaries were widely influential in the Syriac world, not only in the Church of the East but also the miaphysite West Syriac Orthodox Church. The West Syriac author Jacob Bar-Salibi, for example, made use of Ishodad's work in his own commentaries on the Psalms.

Contents 

The subjects of Ishodad's commentaries are as follows:

Old Testament
The Pentateuch
The Book of Sessions:
Joshua
Samuel
Kings
Ecclesiastes
Ruth
Song of Songs
Job
Sirach
Isaiah
Twelve Prophets
Jeremiah
Ezekiel
Daniel
Psalms

New Testament
The four Gospels
Acts of the Apostles
Three "Catholic Epistles":
James
1 Peter
1 John
Epistles of St Paul:
Romans
1 and 2 Corinthians
Galatians
Ephesians
Philippians
Colossians
1 and 2 Thessalonians
1 and 2 Timothy
Titus
Philemon
Hebrews

Characteristics 

Ishodad's work largely followed the lines set by Theodore of Mopsuestia, the pre-eminent biblical interpreter of the Church of the East.  went as far as to argue that Ishodad's arguments themselves could constitute an important source for the reconstruction of Theodore's own views given the paucity of that writer's surviving corpus, though this argument has not been accepted by later scholars. Nonetheless, Ishodad differed from Theodore in certain significant respects. Against Theodore, he accepted the canonicity of the Book of Job and the Song of Songs. Moreover, he drew on a wide range of previous commentators beyond Theodore, including Gregory of Nyssa, Gregory Nazianzen, Basil of Caesarea, and John Chrysostom, and among Syriac authors Aba I, Ephrem the Syrian, Narsai, and Henana of Adiabene.

Clemens Leonhard describes the Commentaries as having a "generally sober character". In line with the traditional view of the exegetical School of Antioch, Ishodad openly rejects allegorical interpretation, and focuses on historical and philosophical problems in the texts. Paul S. Russell views Ishodad's work as displaying a "scholarly sensibility along the lines of modern biblical research" in its careful treatment of different editions of the scriptural texts.

Historical context 

Ishodad wrote the Commentaries in a fraught context. Under al-Mutawakkil, the tolerance of the Abbasid Caliphate towards its Christian and Jewish subjects had begun to wane. Meanwhile, the Church of the East remained divided over the exegetical innovations of Henana of Adiabene, who had drawn on Greek and West Syriac sources in contrast to the official interpretive tradition of Theodore. Though the increasingly characteristic pessimism of the works of Ishodad's era is not evident in the Commentaries, their intended audience is limited to Christian scholars, reflecting a period in which the possibilities for interreligious dialogue were declining.

Modern editions 

The first modern edition of Ishodad's works was prepared by Gustav Diettrich, who published selections of Ishodad's commentaries on the Old Testament in 1902. His New Testament commentaries were edited and translated into English in five volumes by Margaret Dunlop Gibson in 1911–16; Ceslas Van den Eynde prepared a complete edition and translation into French of the Old Testament commentaries in 1950–81.

Notes 
a.  These are treated as a single book in Syriac tradition.

References

Bibliography

External links

 Ishō'dād of Merv on syri.ac

People from Merv
9th-century bishops of the Church of the East
Syriac writers
Bible commentators